Vaveliksia is an extinct genus of Ediacaran  Sponge-like organism with a long, tubular-shaped body and a attachment disk similar to that of  Petalonamids. The Vaveliksia genus contained two species, Vaveliksia velikanovi (which honours Vyacheslav A. Velikanov, a Ukrainian geologist) as well as Vaveliksia vana (with "vana" meaning incorporeal in Latin). The two species vary in appearance to one another, with V. velikanovi having a more tubular-shaped, sack-like morphology with a crown of wrinkles on top of one of its ends as well as possessing a much more disk-like holdfast with V. vana having an appearance more similar to that of a Poriferan, with V. vana having a much more dome-shaped holdfast and a capsule-like body with no crown of wrinkles unlike V. velikanovi.

Etymology
The generic epithet Vaveliksia and specific epithet of the type species V. velikanovi honor the Ukrainian geologist, Vyacheslav A. Velikanov.

The specific epithet of V. vana comes from the Latin vana, "incorporeal."

Occurrence
Vaveliksia velikanovi fossils were found in the Lomozov Beds of the Mogilev Formation in the Dniester River Basin, and in Bernashevka Beds, Yaryshev Formation, in the quarry near Ozaryntsi Village, Podolia, Ukraine

V. vana fossils are known from the Yorga Formation on the Zimnii Bereg (Winter Coast) of the White Sea, Arkhangelsk Region, Russia. There is single reference to V. vana from the Ediacaran deposites in the South Australia, but photographs or description of these fossils were not presented.

Description

The typical Vaveliksia had a frankfurter-like appearance, with one end attached to the substrate by a disk-like holdfast.  The body wall was very thin, and perforated.  At the top was a hole, which may be an osculum, if they were indeed true sponges.  In V. velikanovi, found only in Precambrian strata of the Dneister, the top has a crown of wrinkles which was originally interpreted as tentacles (the first fossils were originally thought to be of a polyp-like organism), and the holdfast is relatively flat and disk-like.  V. vana, found at the White Sea shores and in Australia, is thinner in diameter, has an unwrinkled top, and the holdfast is much more convex or dome-like.  Some specimens of V. vana also had arms.

V. velikanovi fossils range 3–8 cm in length and up to 3 cm in width. The attachment disks range 0.8–2 centimeters  in diameter.

V. vana range 3.5–8.6 cm in length and up to 2 cm in width. The attachment disks range 0.7–1.5 cm in diameter.

See also
List of Ediacaran genera

References

Enigmatic animal taxa
Prehistoric sponge genera
Ediacaran life
White Sea fossils
Precambrian sponges